Erkki Mauno Gustaf Manninen (June 26, 1915 – September 14, 1969) was a Finnish poet, painter and theatre director. He was the son of poet Otto Manninen and writer Anni Swan. Manninen is best known as the founder of Intimiteatteri, which was one of the leading theatres in Helsinki from 1949 to 1987.

In 1965 Manninen married Lina Heydrich who was the widow of assassinated SS-Obergruppenführer Reinhard Heydrich. They met while Heydrich was on a holiday trip to Finland and got married for the purpose of Heydrich changing her last name. According to the Finnish art historian Pirjo Hämäläinen, Manninen read an article about Lina Heydrich, became interested in her and traveled to meet Heydrich on the island of Fehmarn in Germany.

Anthologies 
Rautaiset tornit, 1944.
Kaks silmää vain, 1965.

References 

1915 births
1969 deaths
Finnish theatre directors
Finnish male poets
20th-century Finnish painters
20th-century Finnish poets
20th-century male writers
Artists from Helsinki